Acylals in organic chemistry are a group of chemical compounds sharing a functional group with the general structure RCH(OOCR)2. Acylals are obtained by reaction of carbonyls with acetic anhydride or other acid anhydrides and a suitable catalyst, for instance with sulfated zirconia at low temperatures when used as protective groups for aldehydes. High temperature exposure converts the acylal back to the aldehyde.

References

Functional groups